Edward Ansah (born 1 February 1963) is a Ghanaian footballer. He played in 15 matches for the Ghana national football team from 1992 to 2003. He was also named in Ghana's squad for the 1992 African Cup of Nations tournament.

Managerial career
In May 2019, Indian I-League side Churchill Brothers appointed Ansah as their new head coach for the upcoming season. Churchill Brothers moved to appoint their former goalkeeper and ex-Ghanaian international Edward Ansah as the head coach for the upcoming season. Edward also played for the club during their National Football League (India) seasons, and was a vital part of the Goan team between 1999 and 2004. He also retired with the club.

References

External links
 

1963 births
Living people
Ghanaian footballers
Ghana international footballers
1992 African Cup of Nations players
Association football goalkeepers
People from Tema
Expatriate footballers in India
Ghanaian expatriate sportspeople in India
Churchill Brothers FC Goa players